Ribosome biogenesis protein BRX1 homolog (BRIX1) also known as brix domain-containing protein 2 (BXDC2) is a protein that in humans is encoded by the BRIX1 gene.

References

Further reading